Habibullah Bahar College is a college in Dhaka, Bangladesh which was founded in 1969. Habibullah Bahar  College is located at Shantinagar, at the Dhaka city centre.

It is a university college since it now offers honours and master's courses on 27 subjects under the National University.

Academic departments
 Faculty of Arts 
 Department of Arabic and Islamic Studies
 Department of Bengali
 Department of Islamic History & culture
 Department of Political science
 Department of English
 Department of History
 Department of Philosophy
 Faculty of Business Studies
 Department of BBA (Professional)
 Department of Accounting
 Department of Finance
 Department of Management
 Department of Marketing
 Department of Tourism and Hospitality Management 
 Faculty of Engineering (Professionals)
 Dept. of Computer Science and Engineering
 Faculty of Science
 Department of Botany
 Department of Zoology
 Department of Chemistry
 Department of Biochemistry
 Department of Physics
 Department of Mathematics
 Department of Statistics
 Faculty of Social Science
 Department of Economics
 Department of Political science
 Department of Sociology
 Department of Social Work
 Department of Geography
 Department of Psychology
 Department of Philosophy

Co-curricular activities
Habibullah Bahar College has several organ for co curricular activity.
 HBUC Blood Donation Club
 Debate Club

References

External links

Universities and colleges in Dhaka
Colleges in Dhaka District